Tith Vichara Dany (Khmer: ទិត្យ វិជ្ជរ៉ាដានី) was a popular Cambodian actress who most likely made her debut in 1967. She starred in a majority of films, which include Thavory Meas Bong, Tep Sodachan, and Sovann Pancha, during the nation's golden age of cinema. She is often paired on screen with fellow actor Kong Sam-Oeurn. Other notable actors she started with are Chea Yuthorn and Vann Vannak. In only a span of at least seven years, she is credited with having starred in over one hundred films. Details of her life are relatively unknown, and she is believed to have perished shortly after the rise of the Khmer Rouge regime.

Recently, a popular Cambodian magazine has shed some light on her life during and after the Khmer Rouge regime. She is said to have been married to a Khmer Rouge cadre. By the time Vietnamese forces had invaded Cambodia in 1975, Vichara escaped from her captors and headed back to Phnom Penh. Along the way, she is said to have died of complications during childbirth.

Partial filmography 
Modern times
 Chomrieng Et Preang Tuok (Unprepared Song)
 Pheakdey Snae (Faithful Love)
 Ream Cbong Yeung (Our Elders)
 Thavory meas bong (Thavory)
 Peil Dael Truv Yum (A Time to Cry)
 Mouy Muen Alai
 Srey na men yum
 Ahso oun pong
 San tyronn
 Chrolong Sath Meas
 Chralorm Songsa Srava Kos Kuo
 Kesor Mearlea
 Pyous Chivit
 Sayon Vil Venh
 Prom den Prom chet
 Polto Ahphorp
 Ah Sach Choun Mday
 Bong Kous Heuy Oun
 Chomnov Pailin

Ancient times
 Tep SodaChan
 Sovan Pancha
 Panchapor Tevy II
 Cheung Dai Ouvpouk
 Bomnol Cheam Ouvpok
 Teptyda klok Teip (The Princess of the Magical Gourd)
 Khyum surth heuy khyum yum (I laugh and I Cry)
 Panarong Pongnarith
 Techodamden
 Preas PerPath
 Gonsan Lohete (The Sacred Scarf)
 Gosan sla dok
 Dao pak daong meas  (The Sword With the Golden Handle)
 Neang Champa Meas
 Pijayvonsa
 Pralmath Pralmong
 Phtong moranak
 Tao ak
 Preas Reach Gomah Pichsongvavong
 Srey sross Torng Vong
 Poss vath songnae (The Black Cobra)
 Neang champei sal
 Tralpeng pere
 Sovannthanann
 Pkah Thgall Meas (Khmer: ផ្កាថ្កុលមាស) 1975
 Sangsarajay
 Neang Badacha
 Jassdeth
 Gampoll boross muok pei (The Hero With Two Identities)
 Neang Ompolpich
 Preas Thuong Neang Nag
 Rithysang prune meas
 Akarat Mayura
 Sanmaron Sanmarie
 Gonsan Grawhom (The Red Scarf)
 Praleng khmot (The Spirit)
 Kralmom seurt kamloss yum (The Girls Laugh, The Men Cry)
 Sarai Ondeth
 Kralyam bysath (The Devil Claws)

References 

Cambodian film actresses
1948 births
1976 deaths
20th-century Cambodian actresses
Date of birth missing
Date of death missing
Deaths in childbirth